Two types of steel bodied air-conditioned carriage stock have been used on long distance Queensland Rail services.

M series

In January 1950, Queensland Railways awarded a contract for 99 steel bodied carriages to Commonwealth Engineering, Rocklea. These were purchased to operate the Lander series of trains, The Inlander, The Midlander, The Sunlander and The Westlander entering service between 1953 and 1955.

The original order of 99 cars was for:
8 x MPC class power generation vans
8 x MMV class mail vans
14 x MBC class luggage vans
6 x MDC class dining cars
10 x MAL class first class sitting cars (36 seats)
14 x MBL class second class sitting cars (52 seats)
3 x MCL class composite sitting cars (18 first-class, 24 second-class seats)
15 x MAS class first class sleeping cars (14 berths)
15 x MBS class second class sleeping cars (24 berths)
6 x MCS class composite sleeping cars (8 first-class, 9 second-class berths)

In 2007 as well as 2010, Queensland Rail decided that the 80 remaining M-series carriages would have to be removed from service by December 2013. With the replacement of The Sunlander by the Spirit of Queensland, the M-series carriages were retired in December 2014.

The known ownership/location of the remaining M series lander cars is as follows:

Stored at Ipswich Workshops Rail Museum

 First class sleeper MAS 1492
 Second Class Sitting Car MBL 1513 
 Dining Car  “The Canecutters Bar” MCDL 1518

DownsSteam Tourist Railway & Museum. purchased five cars.
 First Class Sleeper MAS 1501 (No longer on site)
 Baggage Car MBC 1449 (Ex Sunlander).
 Economy Class Sleeper MBS 1483. (Recently for sale on Facebook marketplace)
 Economy Class Sitter MBL 1506.
 MBLM 1526 *Piano Bar*.

Four other carriages were donated by Queensland Rail in October 2015  . 

 First Class Sleeper MAS 1496. (Recently for sale on Facebook marketplace)
 First Class Sleeper MAS 1500 (No longer on site)
 Club Car MCC 1503.
 Kitchen Car MCD 1516.
Also At DownsSteam Tourist Railway & Museum.

 Staff Car MBSC 1486. (From Facebook post; With thanks to the generous ongoing support of Queensland Rail we can proudly announce the latest addition to our fleet! MBS/C 1486 "Staff Car" was delivered to our Drayton Site this morning by Queensland Rail (Heritage). - 24/02/2020)
MCS 1466
MAS 1494

Queensland Pioneer Steam Railway at Swanbank were gifted six coaches upon the retirement of M class from Queensland Rail. The coaches gifted were: 
 Sleeping car MAS 1540 (the final M Car) (Moved to Mitchell in 2019)
 Power car MPCC 1437 (Ex Westlander)
 Dining car MDC 1461 (Ex Sunlander)
 Bar-diner MCD 1528 
 Tropics club car 1502 (Ex Sunlander, still in its 1990s configuration) 
 Combined sleeper-diner "The Stockmans bar" MBSL 1476  (Ex "The Spirit of the Outback")
MXX 1480
Four of these cars have undergone work to return them to traffic as the Queensland Pioneer Steam Railway Dinner Train, which runs over 7 km of scenic railway track at Ipswich, and sport the original blue and white livery they first wore in 1953.

The Q Train, based at The Bellarine Railway, have obtained carriages for the purpose of their restaurant train.

MBL 1509: Converted to a boutique First Class Dining Car A, seating 14 people. (Ex "The Spirit of the Outback")
First class sleeper MAS 1487: Converted to a Q Class combined Dining and Bar Car, seating 28 people.
Economy class sleeper MBS 1474: Converted to a Q Class Dining Car, seating 44 people. (Ex Sunlander)
Staff car MSC 1469 : Converted to a boutique First Class Dining Car B, seating 14 people. (Ex Sunlander) 
Club Car MCC 1521: Club Loco – Bar Car. (Ex "The Spirit of the Outback")
Kitchen car MSD 1460 - converted to a full commercial kitchen with servery and pantry.
Power car MPCC 1430 (Ex Inlander)
 Dining car MDC 1461 (Ex Sunlander)
Dining car MBSC 1533 (Ex "The Spirit of the Outback")
Baggage Car MBC 1454 (Ex Westlander)
Baggage Car MBC 1459 (Ex Sunlander)
Economy Class Sitter MLB 1512 (Ex Westlander)

Gayndah Heritage Railway

 Guards Van MMV 1439,
 Sleeping car MAS 1536, 
 Club Car MCC 1519
 Dining Car MDC 1462 

Economy class sleeper MBS 1473 has been preserved at Cecil Plains railway museum, located at the former railway station..

Economy class sleeper MBSC 1482 has been preserved at Herberton, located at the former railway station.

Privately Owned/ Owner Unknown

Baggage Car MBC 1458 (Ex Spirit of the Outback). Location unknown

First class sleeper MAS 1540 is located next to Mitchell Railway station. Exchanged for with Steam locomotive 761 by QPSR (Story can be found here)

Club car "Captain Starlight Lounge" MCC 1520 (formerly on the Spirit of the Outback) is currently at the Macgregor Forecourt in The University of Queensland as a Yumantra restaurant.

L series

Between October 1981 and October 1985, Comeng built a further 30 carriages. These were built out of stainless steel.

The original order was for 5 x LBL class second class sitting cars (48 seats).

Subsequent orders added an additional:
5 x LAL class first class sitting cars (36 seats)
5 x LBL class second class sitting cars (48 seats)
10 x LAR class roomette sleeping cars (14 berths)
5 x LDC dining cars

In 2007 as well as 2010, Queensland Rail projected that the 30 remaining L series carriages could operate for a further 15 years, pending refurbishment. In July 2014, tenders were called to reconfigure 11 L series carriages. With The Sunlander withdrawn, this allowed The Inlander, Spirit of the Outback and The Westlander to be converted to L series stock.

Current Consists:

Westlander 

Inlander 

Spirit of the Outback

References

Railway coaches of Queensland